Hans Richter (12 January 1919 – 5 October 2008) was a German film actor. He appeared in more than 130 films between 1931 and 1984, mostly in supporting roles. He was born in Brandenburg, Germany and died in Heppenheim, Germany.

Life and career
Hans Richter made his film debut as "Fliegender Hirsch" in Gerhard Lamprecht's Emil and the Detectives (1931), based on the novel of the same name by Erich Kästner. In the following years, Richter become a popular juvenile actor; often playing clever, somewhat cheeky boys (a type similar to Mickey Rooney in the American film during the 1930s). When he reached legal age, he had appeared in over 50 films. After his supporting role as a lazy schoolboy in Die Feuerzangenbowle (1944), Richter got drafted into the German Wehrmacht and was also in war imprisonment for some time.

After the World War, Richter worked as a cabaret artist and also appeared in numerous of the popular Heimatfilms, among them The Black Forest Girl (1950) and The Heath Is Green (1951). He also worked as a film director on two films during the 1950s: Vatertag and Hurrah – Die Firma hat ein Kind, both released in 1955. Since the late 1950s, Richter moved more and more to theatre work, making only sparsely film and television appearances during his later years. He appeared at the Deutsches Schauspielhaus and the Opern- und Schauspielhaus Frankfurt. In 1974, he founded the Festspiele Heppenheim, a summer theatre, in which he worked as an actor/director/producer until his retirement in the 1990s.

Personal life
Hans Richter was married to his wife Ingeborg Bieber for 63 years until his death, aged 89. They had two children. He was awarded the Order of Merit of the Federal Republic of Germany in 1983.

Selected filmography

 Emil and the Detectives (1931) - Fliegender Hirsch
 The Night Without Pause (1931) - Piccolo
 The Blue of Heaven (1932) - Tommy
 The Burning Secret (1933) - Fritz, Page
 Manolescu, Prince of Thieves (1933)
 Hände aus dem Dunkel (1933) - Fritz, Laufbursche
 Love Must Be Understood (1933) - Hotel-Page (uncredited)
 A Trip to the Country (1933) - Max
 S.O.S. Eisberg (1933) - Amateurfunker (uncredited)
 Hitlerjunge Quex (1933) - Franz
 Three Bluejackets and a Blonde (1933) - Fritz, Ilses Bruder
 The Tsarevich (1933)
 The Page from the Dalmasse Hotel (1933) - Der Page Ottokar
 Keine Angst vor Liebe (1933) - Fritz
 A Precocious Girl (1934) - Kurt - ein 14jähriger Junge
 The Black Whale (1934) - Ein Heizerjunge
 Adventure on the Southern Express (1934) - Max, Pikkolo im Speisewagen
 The Flower Girl from the Grand Hotel (1934) - Tommy, ein Straßenjunge
 Liebe dumme Mama (1934) - Der Junge
 Spring Parade (1934) - Lehrling Fritzi (uncredited)
 Abenteuer eines jungen Herrn in Polen (1934) - Fritz, sein Sohn
 The English Marriage (1934) - Tuck Mavis
 Peter (1934) - Hobby, apprentice
 Peter, Paul and Nanette (1935) - Fritz
 Wenn ein Mädel Hochzeit macht (1935) - Ludwig, ihr Bruder
 Knockout (1935) - Page
 Fresh Wind from Canada (1935) - Josef, Hilfsbeleuchter
 Großreinemachen (1935) - Tommy
 Ein ganzer Kerl (1935) - Otto, ein Lehrling
 Pygmalion (1935) - Jonny
 Ein Walzer um den Stephansturm (1935) - Fritz
 Königstiger (1935) - Hans
 The Dreamer (1936) - Graf Franz von Mettke, Gymnasiast
 Soldier Comrades (1936) - Kurt - sein Sohn
 Hilde Petersen postlagernd (1936) - Hans, der Page
 Der verkannte Lebemann (1936) - Ein Boy
 Inkognito (1936) - Lehrling Ewald Panse
 A Hoax (1936) - Manz, Liftboy 'Hotel Kronprinz'
 Uncle Bräsig (1936) - Triddelfitz, Volontär
 Das Frauenparadies (1936) - Fritz, Laufbursche
 The Girl Irene (1936) - Philip
 The Violet of Potsdamer Platz (1936) - Fritz
 The Court Concert (1936) - Gefreiter der Grenzwache Veit
 Der lustige Witwenball (1936)
 Eine Nacht mit Hindernissen (1937) - Peter Mitscherling
 Vor Liebe wird gewarnt (1937) - Alex Palme, Sohn
 The Man Who Was Sherlock Holmes (1937) - A clever boy from Berlin (uncredited)
 Fremdenheim Filoda (1937) - Tom - Führer der 'Singing Boys'
 Ein Volksfeind (1937) - Walter Stockmann
 Das große Abenteuer (1938) - Zeitungsjunge
 Mit versiegelter Order (1938) - Dagor Khan - sein Bruder
 Storms in May (1938) - Hein Andresen
 The Night of Decision (1938) - Pedro
 Drei wunderschöne Tage (1939)
 Silvesternacht am Alexanderplatz (1939) - Klingenberg
 A Hopeless Case (1939) - Student (uncredited)
 In letzter Minute (1939) - Peter Pelle
 Der letzte Appell (1939)
 The Fox of Glenarvon (1940) - Robin Cavendish
 Ein Leben lang (1940) - Notar
 Herz - modern möbliert (1940) - Regissør
 Our Miss Doctor (1940) - Heinz Müller, Primaner
 5 June (1942) - Norbert Nauke
 A Salzburg Comedy (1943) - Detlef
 Die Jungfern vom Bischofsberg (1943) - Otto Kranz
 Die Gattin (1943)
 Die Feuerzangenbowle (1944) - Rosen
 Young Hearts (1944)
 Altes Herz geht auf die Reise (1947) - Philipp
 Arlberg-Express (1948)
 Blocked Signals (1948) - Sein Assistent
 The Last Night (1949) - Willem, Ordonnanz
 I'll Never Forget That Night (1949) - Dick Jaefferson
 Nothing But Coincidence (1949) - Emil Patzenberger
 Artists' Blood (1949) - Antonio - Artist & Anton Lammbein
 Doktor Rosin (1949) - Professor Moeller
 Kätchen für alles (1949) - Herbert John
 Um eine Nasenlänge (1949) - Sperling, Rennbahnbesucher
 Unknown Sender (1950) - Dr. Alfred Braun
 Blondes for Export (1950) - Artist Freddie
 The Black Forest Girl (1950) - Theo Patzke
 No Sin on the Alpine Pastures (1950) - Paul Wittke, Fotoreporter
 You Have to be Beautiful (1951) - Walter Schippe
 Stips (1951) - Albert Pollmann, Friseuer
 Durch dick und dünn (1951) - Schindler
 Johannes und die 13 Schönheitsköniginnen (1951) - Johannes Klettke, genannt Jonny
 Tanz ins Glück (1951) - Antonio Vicente
 The Heath Is Green (1951) - Hannes
 In München steht ein Hofbräuhaus (1951) - Hermann Busch
 Season in Salzburg (1952) - Werner Mack
 Knall and Fall as Imposters (1952) - Knall
 1. April 2000 (1952) - Reporter
 At the Well in Front of the Gate (1952) - Hans, Landstreicher
 Cuba Cabana (1952) - Billy
 The Rose of Stamboul (1953) - Fridolin Müller jun.
 Knall and Fall as Detectives (1953) - Knall
 Red Roses, Red Lips, Red Wine (1953) - Alfred Berg
 The Cousin from Nowhere (1953) - August Kuhbrot
 Girl with a Future (1954) - Peter
 Clivia (1954)
 König der Manege (1954) - Heinz
 The Little Czar (1954) - Boris
 The Spanish Fly (1955) - Dr. Gerlach
 Stopover in Orly (1955) - Fred (uncredited)
 Love Is Just a Fairytale (1955) - Fritz Keller
 Father's Day (1955)
 Wilhelm Tell (1956) - Struth von Winkelried
 Black Forest Melody (1956) - Aribert
 Holiday am Wörthersee (1956) - Eduard, Chauffeur
 Das Donkosakenlied (1956) - Karl, Chauffeur
 Frauen sind für die Liebe da (1957) - Peter Bock
 Zwei Herzen voller Seligkeit (1957) - Franz, Chauffeur
 The Heart of St. Pauli (1957) - Moses, Kellner bei Jonny
 Wenn die Bombe platzt (1958) - Schnecke
 The Muzzle (1958) - Maler Ali
 The Blue Moth (1959) - Regisseur Olten
 Dream Revue (1959) - Ferdy Nuschler, Pressefotograf
 When the Heath Is in Bloom (1960) - Musician Peter
 The Young Sinner (1960) - Müller
 The Haunted Castle (1960) - Jockel
 Ach Egon! (1961) - Behnke
 Davon träumen alle Mädchen (1961) - Referent Mayer
 Beloved Impostor (1961) - Steward Pfister
 Drei Liebesbriefe aus Tirol (1962) - Peter Zwanziger
 Dance with Me Into the Morning (1962) - Privatdetektiv Egon Blume
 His Best Friend (1962) - Max
 Don't Fool with Me (1963) - Gag-Man Klaus Fuchs
 Our Crazy Nieces (1963) - Dr. Heribert Wippel
 The Black Cobra (1963) - Inspektor Knecht
 Glorious Times at the Spessart Inn (1967) - Toni
 Die Feuerzangenbowle (1970) - Dr. Brett
 Section spéciale (1975) - Le général Otto von Stülpnagel, le gouverneur militaire de Paris
 Neues vom Räuber Hotzenplotz (1979) - Bürgermeister
 At the Beginning of Glorious Days (1980)
 Deutschland-Tournee (1984, TV Movie) - Robert

References

Bibliography
 John Holmstrom, The Moving Picture Boy: An International Encyclopaedia from 1895 to 1995, Norwich, Michael Russell, 1996, p.90.

External links

1919 births
2008 deaths
20th-century German male actors
German male film actors
Officers Crosses of the Order of Merit of the Federal Republic of Germany
Actors from Brandenburg
German male child actors
German military personnel of World War II
German prisoners of war in World War II